The 6th César Awards ceremony, presented by the Académie des Arts et Techniques du Cinéma, honoured the best French films of 1980 and took place on 31 January 1981 at the Palais des Congrès in Paris. The ceremony was chaired by Yves Montand and hosted by Pierre Tchernia. The Last Metro won the award for Best Film.

Winners and nominees
The winners are highlighted in bold:

See also
 53rd Academy Awards
 34th British Academy Film Awards

References

External links
 Official website
 
 6th César Awards at AlloCiné

1981
1981 film awards
Cesar